Montaigut-le-Blanc in the commune in the Puy-de-Dôme department in Auvergne in central France.

Photogallery

See also
Communes of the Puy-de-Dôme department

References

External links

Communes of Puy-de-Dôme